Buzitka is a village and municipality in the Lučenec District in the Banská Bystrica Region of Slovakia.

History
In historical records, the village was first mentioned in 1350 (Bozyta) when it belonged to Fil'akovo. From 1554 to 1595 it was occupied by the Ottoman Empire. In 1625, when it was ruled by the family Serényi, it paid tributes to Turks.

References

External links
 
 
https://web.archive.org/web/20071217080336/http://www.statistics.sk/mosmis/eng/run.html
http://www.e-obce.sk/obec/buzitka/buzitka.html

Villages and municipalities in Lučenec District